New York Hota Bavarian SC are a soccer team based in New York City. They currently compete in the New York Club Soccer League (NYCSL) and Super Y League.

History
On May 16, 1971, the club defeated San Pedro Yugoslavs in the final to win the 1971 National Challenge Cup.

Honors
National Challenge Cup
Winner (1): 1971

References

Men's soccer clubs in New York (state)
Diaspora soccer clubs in the United States
1922 establishments in New York (state)
Association football clubs established in 1922
U.S. Open Cup winners